New York Hungaria was an American soccer team which won the National Challenge Cup in 1962.

Honors
National Challenge Cup (1): 1962
Participations in CONCACAF Champions' Cup: 1963
Cosmopolitan Soccer League Champions (6): 1956–1957, 1958–1959, 1959–1960, 1960–1961, 1961–1962, 1992–1993
Cosmopolitan Soccer League Indoor Tournament Champions (2): 1962, 2000

References

Defunct soccer clubs in New York (state)
1962 in American sports
Hungarian-American culture in New York (state)
Hungarian association football clubs outside Hungary
Diaspora soccer clubs in the United States
U.S. clubs in CONCACAF Champions' Cup
U.S. Open Cup winners